Sara Marita Kramer (born 25 October 2001) is a Dutch-born Austrian ski jumper.

Biography
Kramer was born in the Netherlands, but moved from Apeldoorn to Maria Alm in Austria aged 6 when her parents started a pancake restaurant. This was documented for Dutch television program Ik Vertrek (I'm leaving).

Kramer made her debut – representing Austria – in the FIS Ski Jumping World Cup in 2017. She won three gold medals in the 2020 Nordic Junior World Ski Championships. She has also won eight individual events and three team events in the World Cup, as well as two individual third places.

Kramer qualified for the 2022 Winter Olympics and was considered one of the gold medal favorites, but tested positive for COVID-19 on 30 January, one day before the Austrian team was leaving to Beijing, and was not allowed to fly to China even though she had no symptoms. She was leading the ranking of the 2021–22 FIS Ski Jumping World Cup before the Olympics and won 7 out of 11 events. Eventually, she won the individual World Cup that year.

Major tournament results

FIS World Nordic Ski Championships

World Cup

Standings

Wins

References

External links

2001 births
Living people
Austrian female ski jumpers
Austrian people of Dutch descent
FIS Nordic World Ski Championships medalists in ski jumping